The 20st Rhythmic Gymnastics European Championships were held in Kyiv, Ukraine, from June 4 to 6, 2004.

27 national teams participated in the championships. Medals were contested in two disciplines: team and individual all-round. Alina Kabaeva became for the fifth time in a row European champion in individual all-around and Russia – for the third time in a row European team champion. The winner of the medal tally was Russia with two gold and one bronze medals.

It was the first major rhythmic gymnastics competition which was contested in Ukraine.

Medal winners

Results

Individual all-around

Group all-around

Medal table

Notes and references

References

External links
 

Rhythmic Gymnastics European Championships
Rhythmic Gymnastics European Championships
International sports competitions hosted by Ukraine
Rhythmic Gymnastics European Championships
Sports competitions in Kyiv